Álisson Ramsés Becker (born 2 October 1992), known as Alisson Becker or simply Alisson, is a Brazilian professional footballer who plays as a goalkeeper for Premier League club Liverpool and the Brazil national team. He is widely regarded to be one of the best goalkeepers in the world due to his distribution and ability in one-on-one situations.

Becker joined Internacional's academy in 2002, progressing through the youth set up before making his senior debut in 2013. During his four years with Internacional's senior side, Becker won the Campeonato Gaúcho title in each season. He signed for Roma in July 2016 and was awarded Serie A Goalkeeper of the Year in 2017–18. In July 2018, Liverpool signed Becker for a fee of £66.8 million (€72.5 million), making him the most expensive goalkeeper of all time. At Liverpool, Becker has won the Premier League, FA Cup, EFL Cup, UEFA Champions League and FIFA Club World Cup. In 2019, he was named The Best FIFA Goalkeeper and was also the recipient of the inaugural Yashin Trophy.

Becker represented Brazil at various youth levels before making his senior international debut in 2015. He represented the nation at the FIFA World Cup in 2018 and 2022, and the Copa América in 2016, 2019 and 2021, winning the 2019 tournament while also being named its best goalkeeper.

Club career

Internacional

Born in Novo Hamburgo, Rio Grande do Sul, Becker joined Internacional's academy in 2002, aged ten. Having progressed through the youth set up, he featured regularly with the under-23 side, before making his senior debut on 17 February 2013, starting in a 1–1 away draw against Cruzeiro-RS in the Campeonato Gaúcho championship. His Série A debut followed on 25 August 2013 when he started in a 3–3 home draw against Goiás. A backup to his brother Muriel and competing for second-choice with Agenor, he finished his first season with six appearances.

The following year, Becker found himself competing with Brazilian legend Dida, who had joined Internacional from Grêmio. He earned a starting berth in October and finished the year with 11 league appearances to his name. He was an undisputed starter in the following year during which he amassed 57 appearances across all competitions. On 4 February 2016, Becker signed a pre-contract with Italian club Roma, signing a five-year deal for a €7.5 million fee. He played his last game for Internacional on 15 May 2016, keeping a clean sheet in a 0–0 home draw against Chapecoense. During his four years with Internacional's senior side, Becker made over 100 appearances across all competitions and won the Campeonato Gaúcho title in each season.

Roma
Becker completed his transfer to Italian Serie A club Roma in July 2016. He made his debut for the club on 17 August 2016, starting in a 1–1 UEFA Champions League draw with Porto, but spent the majority of the season as understudy to Wojciech Szczęsny. He ultimately made 15 appearances across all competitions from the season but failed to feature in any league fixtures. Szczęsny departed at the start of the following campaign for Juventus, which saw Becker assume the number one jersey. He later revealed that he would have considered leaving Roma had he not been guaranteed more first-team football.

Becker finally made his Serie A debut on the opening weekend of the 2017–18 Serie A campaign, starting in a 1–0 win over Atalanta. He then made his first appearance in the Derby della Capitale on 18 November, starting in a 2–1 win over local rivals Lazio. He was praised for his performances in the 2017–18 Champions League, and played a key role in the club's campaign in which they reached the semi-finals. The club didn't concede a single goal at the Stadio Olimpico in the Champions League, until the match against Liverpool in the semi-finals on 2 May 2018, which they won 4–2 on the night, but lost 7–6 on aggregate. Becker received praise for his performances throughout the 2017–18 season. He kept a total of 22 clean sheets across the 2017–18 season, keeping 17 clean sheets in the league and 5 clean sheets in the Champions League.

Liverpool

2018–19: First season and immediate success
On 19 July 2018, Liverpool confirmed the signing of Becker for a fee of £66.8 million (€72.5 million), making him the most expensive goalkeeper of all time, surpassing the transfers of Ederson (most expensive in pound sterling) and Gianluigi Buffon (most expensive in Euros). However, the fee was broken just four weeks later when Chelsea signed Kepa Arrizabalaga for a reported £71.6 million (€80 million) from Athletic Bilbao. On 10 August, Liverpool confirmed via their official website that he would wear the vacant number 13 shirt in the 2018–19 season.

Becker made his debut for Liverpool on 12 August, keeping a clean sheet in a 4–0 win over West Ham United. He received praise for his subsequent performances in wins over Crystal Palace and Brighton which saw him keep three consecutive clean sheets. In August, Becker was shortlisted for Champions League Goalkeeper of the Season, finishing in second place. On 1 September, in a 2–1 win over Leicester City, he received both praise and criticism for his performance, making several vital saves but also contributing to the opposition's goal. However, with Becker in goal, Liverpool went on a run of 20 games unbeaten in the league from the start of the season which saw the Brazilian break Javier Mascherano's record for the longest-such streak. Becker also played an important role in Liverpool's Champions League group stage campaign, making a vital save late on in their final group game against Napoli as Liverpool won 1–0 to advance to the knockout stages.

On 4 March 2019, he kept his 17th Premier League clean sheet for the season; the most by any Premier League goalkeeper in his debut season since former Liverpool goalkeeper, Pepe Reina in 2006. At the end of the season, Becker kept a total of 21 clean sheets in Premier League, and won the Golden Glove. In the Champions League knockout stages, meanwhile, Becker played a starring role as Liverpool advanced to their second consecutive final in the competition; in their second-leg semi-final at home to Barcelona, he made a number of impressive saves as Liverpool overturned a 3–0 first leg deficit to advance past their opponents with a 4–0 home win. In the final on 1 June 2019, Becker kept a clean sheet for Liverpool as they defeated Tottenham Hotspur 2–0, making eight saves in the process, to win his first trophy with the club.

2019–20: Continued success

After spending his first season with the designated squad number 13, it was announced that Becker would be wearing the number 1 shirt for the 2019–20 season, which had previously been worn by Loris Karius.

Becker started in the 2019 FA Community Shield against Manchester City on 4 August; after a 1–1 draw, Manchester City ultimately won the title 5–4 on penalties. On 9 August 2019, in the opening match of the 2019–20 Premier League season against newly promoted Norwich at Anfield, Becker picked up a calf injury in the first half, and had to be replaced by new signing Adrián after 38 minutes. He was expected to be out injured for a "few weeks". As a result, he was ruled out of the 2019 UEFA Super Cup, which Liverpool won 5–4 on penalties on 14 August, following a 2–2 draw with Chelsea after extra-time.

He returned to the matchday squad on 20 October, in a 1–1 draw with rivals Manchester United. On 30 November, in a 2–1 win over Brighton, he was sent off for handling the ball outside his designated area. On 21 December, Becker kept a clean sheet against Flamengo in the 2019 FIFA Club World Cup Final with Liverpool winning the trophy for the first time. On 19 January 2020, Becker assisted Mohamed Salah's 93rd-minute goal, in a 2–0 home win against Manchester United in the league.

On 6 March 2020, Becker was injured again, meaning he missed the next day's Premier League win against AFC Bournemouth, and the Champions League Round of 16-second leg loss against Atlético Madrid, the final two Liverpool matches before the season was suspended due to the COVID-19 pandemic. He ended the 2019–20 Premier League with a Premier League winner's medal, having made 29 appearances.

2020–21: Continued high level of performance
On 20 September 2020, Becker saved a penalty in Liverpool's second league game of the 2020–21 Premier League season, a 2–0 away win over Chelsea. This was Becker's first penalty save for Liverpool since joining the club, and Jorginho's first missed penalty in nine attempts for Chelsea in all competitions.

On 7 February 2021, Becker made two errors in the space of three minutes, conceding possession to allow Manchester City's İlkay Gündoğan and Raheem Sterling to score, as Liverpool lost 4–1.

On 16 May 2021, Becker scored a dramatic late winner in a 2–1 victory against West Bromwich Albion. With Liverpool chasing a spot in the top four and the score tied at 1–1, Becker came up for a Liverpool corner in the 95th minute. The corner, taken by Trent Alexander-Arnold, found Becker, who managed to score with a header. This was the first goal scored by a keeper in a competitive match in Liverpool's 129-year history, and Becker became the sixth goalkeeper to score in the Premier League.

2021–22: Consistent success
On 4 August 2021, prior to the beginning of the 2021–22 Premier League season, Becker signed a new contract extension to stay with Liverpool until the summer of 2027.

On 15 May 2022, Becker won the FA Cup with Liverpool, defeating rivals Chelsea 6–5 on penalties in the final. Becker saved a penalty from Mason Mount, allowing Liverpool's Kostas Tsimikas to score the winning penalty in the shootout.

In the 2021–22 season, Becker earned a runners-up medal in the Champions League as Liverpool lost 1–0 to Real Madrid in the final.

2022–23: Prevailing adroitness
On 16 October 2022, Becker assisted Mohamed Salah for a late winning goal in Liverpool's 1–0 win over rivals Manchester City in the Premier League. Becker became the goalkeeper with the most goal contributions in Premier League history, with 4 assists and 1 goal for Liverpool. Three days later, on 19 October, Becker saved a penalty from Jarrod Bowen as Liverpool beat West Ham United 1–0 in the Premier League. Becker was named Liverpool's Player of the Month for October 2022.

International career

2015–17: First team breakthrough
After representing Brazil at under-17 and under-20 levels, Becker was called up to the senior squad by manager Dunga for the first two matches of the 2018 FIFA World Cup qualification campaign against Chile and Venezuela. He made his debut against the latter on 13 October, starting in a 3–1 win at the Castelão.

On 5 May 2016, Becker was named in Brazil's 23-man squad for the Copa América Centenario. In the team's first match, a goalless draw against Ecuador, he fumbled a Miller Bolaños shot into his own goal that was waved off because the ball had gone out of play beforehand. He conceded a total of two goals in three matches as Brazil were eliminated in the group stage.

2018–19: The 2018 FIFA World Cup and the 2019 Copa América

In May 2018, Becker was selected in the final 23-man squad for the 2018 World Cup in Russia. He was ever-present as Brazil made it to the quarter-finals before being knocked out by Belgium.

In May 2019, he was included by manager Tite in Brazil's 23-man squad for the 2019 Copa América on home soil. Throughout the tournament, he only conceded one goal in six matches, as Brazil went on to win the title. The only match in which Becker failed to keep a clean sheet was the 3–1 final victory against Peru on 7 July, at the Maracanã Stadium, in which he was beaten by a Paolo Guerrero penalty. Following the tournament, Becker was honoured with the Best Goalkeeper Award for his performances.

2021: The 2021 Copa América
On 13 June 2021, he started in Brazil's opening match of the 2021 Copa América on home soil, keeping a clean sheet in a 3–0 win over Venezuela. He was an unused substitute in his nation's 1–0 defeat to rivals Argentina in the final on 10 July, with Ederson starting in his place.

2021–22: The 2020 Summer Olympics and the 2022 FIFA World Cup
On 15 June 2021, he was included in Brazil's 50-man preliminary squad for the 2020 Summer Olympics, though he was not included in the final squad.

On 7 November 2022, Becker was named in the squad for the 2022 World Cup in Qatar. Brazil were defeated by Croatia in the quarter-finals.

Style of play
Becker has been praised for his ability to produce crucial saves and brilliance in one-on-one situations, as well as his positioning, distribution and consistency; he is rated by some in the sport as the best goalkeeper in the world. Becker cites former Barcelona goalkeeper Víctor Valdés as an inspiration, due to his ability to play out from the back, as well as Manuel Neuer, for his 'sweeper keeper' style. Becker is also known for his speed and timing when rushing off his line, as well as his ability to clear or challenge for the ball with his feet outside the area, or get to ground quickly to collect or parry the ball inside the box; moreover, due to his distribution, he is capable of playing the ball out from the back quickly with his hands as well as his feet, and also has the ability to launch attacks, or pick out midfielders with his long goal kicks. His skills with the ball at his feet and composure in possession have even seen him take on opponents on occasion, when put under pressure, and allow his teams to play with a high defensive line.

Despite his height (standing at ), strength, size, and his large, powerful physique, Becker is also an agile and athletic goalkeeper. He possesses good reflexes and excellent shot-stopping abilities, as well as the capacity to produce spectacular and instinctive reaction saves when necessary, but he is predominantly known for his efficient style of goalkeeping, courtesy of his anticipation, consistency, composure, intelligence, positional sense, and goalkeeping technique, which enables him to read the game, cover the goal well, and stop shots without having to resort to histrionics. Furthermore, he also known for his handling, and is effective at dealing with high balls, which enables him to come out and claim crosses and command his area well.

Becker is regarded by some sport pundits, due to his statistical performances, as the most proficient goalkeeper in the Premier League, and arguably even the best in the world, when left in an individual battle with an opponent.

His playing style has also drawn comparisons with compatriots Júlio César, Muriel and Cláudio Taffarel in the media. The moniker "The Messi of goalkeepers" has also been attached to him.

Personal life
Becker's older brother Muriel is also a goalkeeper and was developed at Internacional. Becker's paternal family is of German descent, with his father and grandmother speaking German fluently. While at Roma, Becker was nicknamed "The German." In addition to his native Portuguese, Becker also speaks Italian and English. In May 2019, he was appointed a goodwill ambassador by the World Health Organization (WHO).

In 2015, Becker married Natália Loewe, a doctor from Brazil. They have a daughter named Helena, born on 29 April 2017 and a son, Matteo, born on 14 June 2019. Their second son was born on 10 May 2021.

Becker and Natália have been WHO advocates for pro-active care of mental health.

Becker is a devout Pentecostal Christian, and holds baptisms in his swimming pool, hosting the baptisms of teammate Roberto Firmino and the wife of Manchester United player Fred. He has been nicknamed "The Holy Goalie" by teammate Virgil van Dijk due to his faith, and lifted the Champions League trophy wearing a T-shirt with "† = ❤" on it.

On 24 February 2021, Becker's father José Agostinho drowned in a lake near his holiday home in Lavras do Sul. Local officials believe no foul play was involved in the incident.

Career statistics

Club

International

Honours

Internacional
Campeonato Gaúcho: 2013, 2014, 2015, 2016

Liverpool
Premier League: 2019–20
FA Cup: 2021–22
EFL Cup: 2021–22
UEFA Champions League: 2018–19, runner up: 2021–22
FIFA Club World Cup: 2019

Brazil U23
Toulon Tournament: 2013

Brazil
Copa América: 2019

Individual
The Best FIFA Goalkeeper: 2019
Yashin Trophy: 2019
IFFHS World's Best Goalkeeper: 2019
UEFA Champions League Goalkeeper of the Season: 2018–19
Premier League Golden Glove: 2018–19, 2021–22
FIFA FIFPro World11: 2019, 2020
UEFA Champions League Squad of the Season: 2017–18, 2018–19
Serie A Goalkeeper of the Year: 2017–18
Serie A Team of the Year: 2017–18
Globe Soccer Awards Best Goalkeeper of the Year: 2018, 2019
Copa América Golden Glove: 2019
Copa América Team of the Tournament: 2019
IFFHS Men's World Team: 2019
Samba Gold: 2019
UEFA Team of the Year: 2019
Liverpool Goal of the Season: 2020–21
PFA Team of the Year: 2021–22 Premier League

See also
List of goalscoring goalkeepers

References

External links

Profile at the Liverpool F.C. website

1992 births
Living people
People from Novo Hamburgo
Sportspeople from Rio Grande do Sul
Brazilian footballers
Association football goalkeepers
Sport Club Internacional players
A.S. Roma players
Liverpool F.C. players
Campeonato Brasileiro Série A players
Serie A players
Premier League players
FA Cup Final players
UEFA Champions League winning players
Brazil youth international footballers
Brazil international footballers
Copa América Centenario players
2018 FIFA World Cup players
2019 Copa América players
2021 Copa América players
2022 FIFA World Cup players
Copa América-winning players
Brazilian expatriate footballers
Expatriate footballers in England
Expatriate footballers in Italy
Brazilian expatriate sportspeople in England
Brazilian expatriate sportspeople in Italy
Brazilian people of German descent
Brazilian Pentecostals
Brazilian evangelicals